The second Guangxi campaign within the second Sino-Japanese War, was fought between Japan and the Republic of China from late April to July, 1945.

Japan

Army
11th Army - Lt. Gen.  Yukio Kasahara [4] Sachio Kasahara 
 13th Division - Lieutenant-General Minetaro Yoshida [4]
 13th Infantry Brigade Group
 65th Infantry Regiment
 104th Infantry Regiment
 116th Infantry Regiment
 19th Mountain Artilley Regiment
 17th Cavalry Regiment
 13th Engineer Regiment
 13th Transport Regiment
 222nd Division - Lieutenant-General Kasahara Kahee
 22nd Infantry Brigade Group
 84th Infantry regiment
 85th Infantry regiment
 86th Infantry regiment regimental
 22nd Division reconnaissance troops
 52nd mountain artillery regiment
 22nd military engineer regiment
 22nd transport regiment
 Signal Communication Unit
 Medical team
 1st &  2nd Field Hospital
 27th Division [elements] - Lieutenant-General Ochiai Jinkurō
 27th Infantry Brigade Group
 1st China Garrison Infantry Regiment
 2nd China Garrison Infantry Regiment
 3rd China Garrison Infantry Regiment
 27th Division reconnaissance troops
 27th Mountain Artillery Regiment
 27th Military Engineer Regiment
 27th Transport Regiment
 Signal Communication Unit
 Medical team
 Weapon Service team
 1st - 4th Field Hospital
 veterinary hospital.
 58th Division -  Lieutenant-General Kawamata Osato  
 51st Infantry brigade - Major-General  Shirahama Shigetada 
 92nd Independent infantry battalion
 93rd Independent infantry battalion
 94 Independent infantry battalion
 95 Independent infantry battalion
 52nd Infantry brigade - Major-General Nagata Fumio 
 96th Independent infantry battalion
 106th Independent infantry battalion
 107th Independent infantry battalion
 108th Independent infantry battalion
 Labor troops, signal communication unit, transport team, field hospital, veterinary hospital.
 88th Independent Mixed Brigade - Major-General Kaitō Kiyoshi 
 519th Independent Infantry Battalion
 520th Independent Infantry Battalion
 521st Independent Infantry Battalion
 522nd Independent Infantry Battalion
 523rd Independent Infantry Battalion,
 artillery troops
 labor troops team

Airforces

China

Army
National Military Council
 2nd Front Army - Chang Fu-kuei
 46th Corps - Li Hsing-su
 188th Division
 175th Division
 New 19th Division
 64th Corps - Chang Shih
 131st Division
 156th Division
 159th Division
 3rd Front Army -  Tang En-po
 27th Army Group - Lu Yu-tang
 20th Corps - Yang Kan-tsai
 133rd Division
 134th Division
 26th Corps - Ting Chih-pan
 41st Division
 44th Division
 169th Division
 94th Corps - Mu Ting-fang
 5th Division - Li Tse-fen
 43rd Division - Li Shih-lin
 121st Division - Ch Ching-min
 71st Corps - Chen Ming-jen
 87th Division -
 88th Division -
 91st Division -
 29th Corps - Chen Ta-ching
 169th Division
 19th Division
 11th Division -

Airforces

Notes

Sources
Hsu Long-hsuen and Chang Ming-kai, History of The Sino-Japanese War (1937-1945) 2nd Ed., 1971. Translated by Wen Ha-hsiung, Chung Wu Publishing; 33, 140th Lane, Tung-hwa Street, Taipei, Taiwan Republic of China.

Guangxi
Guangxi